Hernán René Sandoval Villatoro (born 22 July 1983) is a Guatemalan football striker who plays for local club Comunicaciones in the Guatemala's top division.

Club career
Nicknamed el Camello (the camel), Sandoval played for the U-20's of local giants Comunicaciones before becoming professional and has also had a loan spell at Antigua GFC. In November 2007 he suffered a double fracture of his right leg in a game against CD Zacapa which took him out of the game until the start of the 2009 preseason.

International career
Sandoval made his debut for Guatemala in an August 2003 friendly match against Ecuador and has earned a total of 20 caps, scoring 3 goals. He has represented his country in 2 FIFA World Cup qualification matches as well as at the 2005 and 2007 CONCACAF Gold Cups and the UNCAF Nations Cup 2005.

His final international was an August 2007 friendly match against Panama.

External links

 Player profile - CSD Comunicaciones

References

1983 births
Living people
Sportspeople from Guatemala City
Guatemalan footballers
Guatemala international footballers
2005 UNCAF Nations Cup players
2005 CONCACAF Gold Cup players
2007 CONCACAF Gold Cup players
Comunicaciones F.C. players
Antigua GFC players

Association football forwards